The 1983 NFL Draft was the procedure by which National Football League teams selected amateur college football players. It is officially known as the NFL Annual Player Selection Meeting. The draft was held April 26–27, 1983, at the New York Sheraton Hotel in New York City, New York. No teams elected to claim any players in the supplemental draft that year.

The draft is frequently referred to as the quarterback class of 1983, because six quarterbacks were taken in the first round—John Elway, Todd Blackledge, Jim Kelly, Tony Eason, Ken O'Brien, and Dan Marino—the highest number of first round picks for the position. Of these quarterbacks, Elway, Kelly, Eason, and Marino played in the Super Bowl, Elway, Kelly, O'Brien, and Marino were selected to play in the Pro Bowl, and Elway, Kelly, and Marino have been inducted into the Pro Football Hall of Fame. All six quarterbacks were drafted by American Football Conference (AFC) teams, with every member of the five-team AFC East (the Baltimore Colts, Miami Dolphins, Buffalo Bills, New York Jets, and New England Patriots) selecting a quarterback. In eleven of the sixteen years following this draft, the AFC was represented in the Super Bowl by a team led by one of these quarterbacks: five with the Denver Broncos and Elway, four with the Bills and Kelly, one with the Dolphins and Marino, and one with the Patriots and Eason.

They met with little success in the Super Bowl, however, compiling a 2–9 record among them, with an 0–9 record for their first 14 years in the league. The only two wins were by Elway in XXXII and XXXIII during his final two seasons in 1997 and 1998. Three of the most lopsided Super Bowl losses in history also came at the hands of quarterbacks from the Class of '83: Elway, a 55–10 loss to the San Francisco 49ers in XXIV; Eason, a 46–10 loss to the Chicago Bears in XX; and Kelly, a 52–17 loss to the Dallas Cowboys in XXVII. Marino would only reach the Super Bowl once in a 38–16 loss to San Francisco in XIX following the end of his second season, when he won league MVP. Kelly and the Bills would appear in the Super Bowl for a record four consecutive years, from 1990 to 1993, but lost all four.

Of the six first round quarterbacks drafted, Hall of Famers Elway and Kelly did not sign with the teams that selected them for the 1983 season. Elway, who had made his antipathy towards the Colts known long before the draft, was also a promising baseball player in the New York Yankees organization. With Yankees owner George Steinbrenner aggressively pursuing a commitment from Elway to play baseball full-time, Elway and his agent, Marvin Demoff, successfully leveraged the threat of Elway abandoning football altogether to compel the Colts to trade Elway to the Broncos a few days after selecting him with the first overall pick of the draft.

Kelly, the other holdout, instead signed with the Houston Gamblers of the United States Football League (USFL), where he led the springtime circuit in passing in both 1984 and 1985. Kelly was set to play for the New Jersey Generals when the USFL planned to switch to a fall season in 1986, but when the USFL won only $1 (trebled to $3) from its antitrust lawsuit vs. the NFL on July 29, 1986, Kelly finally signed with the Bills three weeks later.

Including the aforementioned Elway, Kelly, and Marino, a total of seven players drafted in the first round have been inducted into the Pro Football Hall of Fame and eight players overall have been inducted. Each round of this draft also contained at least one player who was later selected to play in the Pro Bowl. Several websites, including Bleacher Report and Athlon Sports, have called the class of 1983 the greatest of all time.

Player selections

Round one
{|class="wikitable sortable sortable" style="width: 100%"
|-
!style="background:#A8BDEC;" width=7%|Pick # !!width=42% style="background:#A8BDEC;"|NFL Team !!width=15% style="background:#A8BDEC;"|Player !!width=16% style="background:#A8BDEC;"|Position !!width=20% style="background:#A8BDEC;"|College
|-
|align=center|1||Baltimore Colts (rights later traded to Denver)||bgcolor="#FFCC00"|John Elway||Quarterback||Stanford
|-
|align=center|2||Los Angeles Rams (from Houston through Seattle)||bgcolor="#FFCC00"|Eric Dickerson||Running Back||SMU
|-
|align=center|3||Seattle Seahawks (from Los Angeles Rams)||bgcolor="#faecc8"|Curt Warner||Running Back||Penn State
|-
|align=center|4||Denver Broncos(rights later traded to Baltimore)||bgcolor="#faecc8"|Chris Hinton||Guard||Northwestern
|-
|align=center|5||San Diego Chargers (from San Francisco)||Billy Ray Smith||Linebacker||Arkansas
|-
|align=center|6||Chicago Bears||bgcolor="#FFCC00"|Jim Covert||Offensive Tackle||Pittsburgh
|-
|align=center|7||Kansas City Chiefs||Todd Blackledge||Quarterback||Penn State
|-
|align=center|8||Philadelphia Eagles||Michael Haddix||Running Back||Mississippi State
|-
|align=center|9||Houston Oilers (from Seattle)||bgcolor="#FFCC00"|Bruce Matthews||Offensive Tackle||USC
|-
|align=center|10||New York Giants||bgcolor="#faecc8"|Terry Kinard || Safety ||Clemson
|-
|align=center|11||Green Bay Packers (from New Orleans)||Tim Lewis||Cornerback||Pittsburgh
|-
|align=center|12||Buffalo Bills||Tony Hunter||Tight End||Notre Dame
|-
|align=center|13||Detroit Lions||James Jones||Fullback||Florida
|-
|align=center|14||Buffalo Bills (from Cleveland)||bgcolor="#FFCC00"|Jim Kelly||Quarterback||Miami (FL)
|-
|align=center|15||New England Patriots||Tony Eason||Quarterback||Illinois
|-
|align=center|16||Atlanta Falcons||Mike Pitts||Defensive End||Alabama
|-
|align=center|17||St. Louis Cardinals||Leonard Smith||Cornerback||McNeese State
|-
|align=center|18||Chicago Bears (from Tampa Bay)||Willie Gault||Wide Receiver||Tennessee
|-
|align=center|19||Minnesota Vikings||bgcolor="#faecc8"|Joey Browner||Cornerback||USC
|-
|align=center|20||San Diego Chargers (from Green Bay)||bgcolor="#faecc8"|Gary Anderson||Running Back||Arkansas
|-
|align=center|21||Pittsburgh Steelers||Gabriel Rivera||Defensive Tackle||Texas Tech
|-
|align=center|22||San Diego Chargers (from San Diego through San Francisco)||bgcolor="#faecc8"|Gill Byrd||Cornerback||San Jose State
|-
|align=center|23||Dallas Cowboys||Jim Jeffcoat||Defensive End||Arizona State
|-
|align=center|24||New York Jets||bgcolor="#faecc8"|Ken O'Brien||Quarterback||California-Davis
|-
|align=center|25||Cincinnati Bengals||Dave Rimington||Center||Nebraska
|-
|align=center|26||Los Angeles Raiders||bgcolor="#faecc8"|Don Mosebar||Center||USC
|-
|align=center|27||Miami Dolphins||bgcolor="#FFCC00"|Dan Marino||Quarterback||Pittsburgh
|-
|align=center|28||Washington Redskins||bgcolor="#FFCC00"|Darrell Green||Cornerback||Texas A&M–Kingsville
|}

Round two

Round three

Round four

Round five

Round six

Round seven

Round eight

Round nine

Round ten

Round eleven

Round twelve

Hall of Fame inductees

 Eric Dickerson, running back from Southern Methodist, taken 1st round 2nd overall by Los Angeles Rams
Inducted: Professional Football Hall of Fame Class of 1999.
 Jim Kelly, quarterback from Miami, taken 1st round 14th overall by Buffalo Bills
Inducted: Professional Football Hall of Fame Class of 2002.
 John Elway, quarterback from Stanford, taken 1st round 1st overall by Baltimore Colts
Inducted: Professional Football Hall of Fame Class of 2004.
 Dan Marino, quarterback from Pittsburgh, taken 1st round 27th overall by Miami Dolphins
Inducted: Professional Football Hall of Fame Class of 2005.
 Bruce Matthews, offensive lineman from Southern California, taken 1st round 9th overall by Houston Oilers
Inducted: Professional Football Hall of Fame Class of 2007.
 Darrell Green, cornerback from Texas A&I, taken 1st round 28th overall by Washington Redskins
Inducted: Professional Football Hall of Fame Class of 2008.
Richard Dent, defensive end from Tennessee State, taken 8th round 203rd overall by Chicago Bears
Inducted: Professional Football Hall of Fame Class of 2011.
Jim Covert, offensive lineman from Pittsburgh, taken 1st round 6th overall by Chicago Bears
Inducted: Professional Football Hall of Fame Class of 2020.

Notable undrafted players

References

External links
 NFL.com – 1983 Draft
 databaseFootball.com – 1983 Draft
 Pro Football Hall of Fame
 Pro Sports Transactions

National Football League Draft
Draft
NFL Draft
NFL Draft
American football in New York City
1980s in Manhattan
Sporting events in New York City
Sports in Manhattan